This is a chronological list of canon lawyers. The listing is by date of death.

 Albert Avogadro (1149–1214)
 Bernardus Compostellanus Antiquus (13th century)
 Bartholomew of Brescia (died 1258)
 Henry of Segusio (Hostiensis) (c. 1200–1271)
 William Durandus, the Younger (died 1328)
 Astesanus de Ast (died c. 1330)
 Novella d'Andrea (died 1333)
 Bartholomew of San Concordio (c. 1260–1347) 
 Giovanni d'Andrea  (c. 1270–1348)
 John Acton (died 1350)
 Bonifazio Vitalini (c. 1320–after 1388)
 John Alen (1476–1534)
 Franz Burkard of Ingolstadt (died 1539) 
 Antoine de Mouchy (1494–1574)
 Franz Burkard of Bonn (died 1584)
 Antonio Agustín y Albanell (1516–1586)
 Martín de Azpilcueta (1491–1586)
 Hendrik de Moy (+1610)
 Henry Swinburne (1551–1624)
 Agostinho Barbosa (1589–1649)
 Ludwig Engel (died 1694)
 Francesco Antonio Begnudelli-Basso (died 1713)
 Giovanni Clericato (1633–1717)
 Jean-Pierre Gibert (1660–1736)
 Vitus Pichler (1670–1736)
 Placidus Böcken (1690–1752)
 Carbo Sebastiano Berardi (1719–1768)
 Pietro Ballerini (1698–1769)
 Johann Caspar Barthel (1697–1771)
 Girolamo Ballerini (1701–1781)
 Maurus von Schenkl (1749–1816)
 Marie Dominique Bouix (1808–1870)
 Camillus Tarquini (1810–1874)
 Ferdinand Walter (1794–1879)
 Wilhelm Molitor (1819–1880)
 Friedrich Heinrich Vering (1833–1896)
 Felice Cavagnis (1841–1906)

 
Canon lawyers